The Alexandra Park Street Circuit was a temporary race track between the late 1940s and 1953 on streets within the town of Pietermaritzburg, South Africa. This street track was no longer used after the opening of the permanent Roy Hesketh Circuit.

References

Motorsport venues in South Africa
Defunct sports venues in South Africa
Defunct motorsport venues
Pietermaritzburg